Gorka José Unda Velasco (born 16 June 1987 in Madrid) is a Spanish professional footballer who plays for Thai club Chainat Hornbill as a midfielder.

References

External links

1987 births
Living people
Footballers from Madrid
Spanish footballers
Association football midfielders
Segunda División B players
Tercera División players
CF Rayo Majadahonda players
Real Madrid Castilla footballers
Getafe CF B players
CD Guadalajara (Spain) footballers
Real Madrid C footballers
SKN St. Pölten players
Gorka Unda
Gorka Unda
Spanish expatriate footballers
Expatriate footballers in Austria
Expatriate footballers in Thailand
Spanish expatriate sportspeople in Thailand